Geoff Kabush is a Canadian cyclo-cross cyclist and cross-country mountain biker. At the 2000 Summer Olympics, he finished in 9th place in the cross-country race.  He then competed in the same event at the 2008 Summer Olympics, finishing in 20th place.  At the 2012 Summer Olympics, he again competed in the Men's cross-country at Hadleigh Farm, finishing in 8th place. He has also been successful in cyclo-cross, having won the Canadian national cyclo-cross championship five times.

Major results

Cyclo-cross

2004–2005
 1st  National Championships
 1st Gran Prix of Gloucester 1
 2nd Gran Prix of Gloucester 2
 2nd Beacon Cyclo-cross
 3rd Clif Bar Grand Prix
 3rd Star-Crossed
2005–2006
 3rd Star-Crossed
2006–2007
 2nd National Championships
 2nd Scion Stumptown Cup
 3rd Star-Crossed
2007–2008
 2nd Fort Lewis College SquawkerCross
2008–2009
 1st  National Championships
 1st Jim Horner Grand Prix
2009–2010
 1st  National Championships
 1st Jim Horner Grand Prix
2010–2011
 USGP of Cyclocross
1st Mercer Cup Day 1
3rd Mercer Cup Day 2
2011–2012
 USGP of Cyclocross
2nd Fort Collins Cup Day 1
3rd Fort Collins Cup Day 2
3rd Derby City Cup Day 2
3rd Bend Day 2
2012–2013
 1st  National Championships
 1st BC Grand Prix
 USGP of Cyclocross
3rd New Belgium Cup Day 2
2013–2014
 1st  National Championships
 1st BC Grand Prix
 2nd Deschutes Brewery Cup
 3rd CrossVegas
2014–2015
 1st Manitoba Grand Prix
 2nd National Championships
2015–2016
 2nd National Championships
 2nd Manitoba Grand Prix
2016–2017
 2nd National Championships
2017–2018
 2nd National Championships
2018–2019
 2nd National Championships

MTB

2005
 1st  National XCO Championships
2006
 1st  National XCO Championships
2007
 1st  Pan American XCO Championships
 1st  National XCO Championships
2009
 1st  National XCO Championships
 2nd  Team relay, UCI World Championships
2010
 1st  National XCO Championships
2014
 1st  National XCO Championships
2016
 1st  National XCM Championships

Road
2017
 1st

References

External links

Canadian male cyclists
Cross-country mountain bikers
Cyclo-cross cyclists
Living people
Olympic cyclists of Canada
Cyclists at the 2000 Summer Olympics
Cyclists at the 2008 Summer Olympics
Cyclists at the 2012 Summer Olympics
1977 births
People from Courtenay, British Columbia
Canadian mountain bikers
Cyclists from British Columbia